The Durand et Delaville RB.01 Beauregard was a tourism aircraft built in France in the early 1950s.

Design
The RB.01 was a single-seat parasol monoplane of amateur construction.

Specifications

References

Further reading

1950s French aircraft
Parasol-wing aircraft